The 42nd Boat Race took place on 28 March 1885.  Held annually, the Boat Race is a side-by-side rowing race between crews from the Universities of Oxford and Cambridge along the River Thames.   In a race umpired by former Cambridge rower Robert Lewis-Lloyd, the lead changed hands several times.  Oxford won by a margin of  lengths in a time of 21 minutes 36 seconds.  The victory took the overall record to 23–18 in favour of Oxford.

Background
The Boat Race is a side-by-side rowing competition between the University of Oxford (sometimes referred to as the "Dark Blues") and the University of Cambridge (sometimes referred to as the "Light Blues").  First held in 1829, the race takes place on the  Championship Course on the River Thames in southwest London.  The rivalry is a major point of honour between the two universities;  it is followed throughout the United Kingdom and as of 2014, broadcast worldwide.  Cambridge went into the race as reigning champions, having won the previous year's race by  lengths, while Oxford held the overall lead, with 22 victories to Cambridge's 18 (excluding the "dead heat" of 1877).

Oxford's coach was G. C. Bourne, who had rowed for the Dark Blues in the 1882 and 1883 races.  There is no record of who coached Cambridge, who were seriously disrupted in the build-up to the race, with Edric Wolseley Haig contracting mumps, J. C. Brown breaking a floating rib and William King Hardacre being introduced to the crew days prior to replace him.  The umpire for the race was Robert Lewis-Lloyd (who had rowed for Cambridge four times between 1856 and 1859).

Crews
The Oxford crew weighed an average of 12 st 6.75 lb (79.1 kg),  more than their opponents.  It was the heaviest crew to have ever featured in the Boat Race.  Cambridge's crew contained four rowers who had Boat Race experience, including Fraser Elmslie Churchill and Sidney Swann, both of whom were participating in their third race.  Similarly, Oxford saw four former Blues return, with Douglas McLean making his third appearance and rowing with his brother Hector for the first time.

The race featured one registered non-British participant in Oxford's number two, J. S. Clemons, who originated from Tasmania.

Race

Cambridge were pre-race favourites.  Oxford won the toss and elected to start from the Surrey station, handing the Middlesex side of the river to Cambridge. The race started at 12:26 p.m. in fine weather on a moderate tide.  Although Oxford made the better start, Cambridge held a half-of-a-length lead by the time the crews passed the Craven Steps.  With the advantage of the bend in the river, the Oxford stroke H. Girdlestone, without increasing the stroke rate,  took his crew level, and ahead at the Mile Post. Although the Cambridge stroke Frederick Pitman tried to restore parity by encouraging a spurt, Oxford held the Light Blues off and by Hammersmith Bridge held a length's lead.  Despite appearing "as if the crew going to pieces" after some difficult conditions, Oxford extended their lead to two lengths by The Doves pub. Approaching Barnes Bridge, the Dark Blues had to avoid a skiff, allowing Cambridge to come back at them, before pushing on once again on to win by  lengths in a time of 21 minutes 36 seconds, and took the overall record to 23–18 in Oxford's favour.

After the race it was noted that the Oxford number three, P. W. Taylor, had dislocated his shoulder but had continued despite his injury.

References
Notes

Bibliography

External links
 Official website

The Boat Race
1885 in English sport
March 1885 sports events